The Men's combined competition of the Nagano 1998  Olympics was held at Hakuba. The downhill was originally scheduled before the slalom runs, but weather delays meant that the slalom runs were run first.

The defending world champion was Kjetil André Aamodt of Norway, who was also the defending World Cup combined champion.

Results

References 

Men's combined
Winter Olympics